BullionByPost is a British online bullion dealer based in Birmingham, which delivers gold and silver bars and coins to customers through the post. It is the UK's biggest online gold dealer.

History
The company was founded by entrepreneur Rob Halliday-Stein in 2009. In the 2012–2013 financial year, sales hit £87million with profits of £2 million. BullionByPost is a trading name of Jewellery Quarter Bullion Limited.

In 2016 BullionByPost was described as Britain's biggest online gold dealer. At one point it had £5.6 million of sales in one day, beating its previous record (in 2014) of £4.4 million.  Halliday-Stein ascribed the increase in sales to the possible election of Donald Trump as President of the United States, which had led to uncertainty in the market. BullionByPost was getting towards £10 million of sales per day later in 2016.

Service
Bullion By Post offers live product pricing based on the live metal prices, and the ability to order online, and have bullion delivered the next day.
Orders are delivered fully insured by Lloyd's of London.

TV Campaign
In August 2013, BullionByPost launched its first television advertising campaign, broadcast on satellite television over a three-week period. The ad was produced by London advertising agency Space City Productions. One of the aims was to increase the number of female customers.

Awards
BullionByPost won the Best Financial Services Award at the 2013 eCommerce Awards. and Rob Halliday-Stein was shortlisted in Entrepreneur of the Year category at the 2013 Growing Business Awards. BullionByPost has also been awarded the eKomi Gold Seal of Approval for customer service. In June 2014, Rob Halliday-Stein was named Director of the Year at IoD West Midlands Awards.

References

External links
 BullionByPost Official Website

Companies based in Birmingham, West Midlands
Bullion dealers
British companies established in 2009